The Mazda Roadpacer AP (Anti-Pollution) is a full-size sedan that was sold by Mazda in Japan between 1975 and 1977, although the last car was not sold until 1979. It was based on the Australian Holden HJ and HX series Premier. Premiers were shipped to Japan without engines or transmissions, and Mazda fitted a 1.3-liter 13B Wankel engine into the bay. The Roadpacer AP has the distinction of being the only General Motors product ever to be fitted for production with a rotary engine.

The Roadpacer was introduced to compete with large Japanese flagship sedans Toyota Century, Nissan President, Isuzu Statesman de Ville, and the Mitsubishi Debonair. The Roadpacer's platform was the shorter version of the one used by Isuzu for the Statesman de Ville. The Roadpacer was conceived just years before Mazda entered into an engineering partnership with Ford, which materialized at around the same time the Roadpacer went on sale.

The 13B produced less power than the Red series motors that powered the equivalent Holdens, and significantly less torque, meaning performance was restrained with a  top speed, poor acceleration and terrible fuel consumption. Contemporary reports suggest 9 mpg (26 L per 100 km). The three-speed automatic transmission with a steering column shift lever was sourced from Jatco and was shared with the LA series Mazda Luce. The vehicle was not in compliance with Japanese regulations concerning engine displacement and exterior dimensions, and was classed in the mid-size car segment, while the engine displacement placed it in the lower annual road tax brackets. If the car was recognized as being for business use as an executive company car, the road tax bill was very minimal.

While the Holden HJ Premier itself was well equipped, Mazda decided to add more. The interior was offered with a choice of velour upholstered bucket seats and a center console for the front passengers or a split front bench seat.

The price was also considered high at ¥3.8 million yen (US$13,000) in 1975 ($ in  dollars ). This was about twice the price of a contemporary Mazda Cosmo or Mazda Luce. Originally intended as transport for high-ranking government officials, the car was sold in the wake of the first fuel crisis and was not a commercial success. Production ceased in 1977 with only 800 units sold. Most were sold to government departments and were later crushed, meaning Roadpacers are rare nowadays; their counterpart model, the Holden Premier is considered a classic car in Australia.

One can be found on display in the Transport World Motor Museum in Invercargill, New Zealand.

References

External links 

 Official Mazda history of Rotary Engine Graffiti
 Mazda Roadpacer

Roadpacer
Sedans
Cars introduced in 1975
Cars powered by Wankel engines